The Copper also translated as The Grasper is a 1958 West German crime film directed by Eugen York and starring Hans Albers, Hansjörg Felmy and Susanne Cramer. It is a remake of the 1930 film The Copper which Albers had also starred in. It was shot at the Tempelhof Studios in West Berlin as well as on location in Hamburg and Essen. The film's sets were designed by the art directors Gabriel Pellon and Theo Zwierski.

Synopsis
Otto Friedrich Dennert a veteran of the Essen police force is known as "The Grabber" for his unconventional methods. While investigating a series of killings of women he reaches retirement age. The case is taken over by a new team, including Dennert's son Harry. Convinced that they have arrested the wrong person, Dennert begins investigating by himself with assistance from the criminal underworld.

Cast
 Hans Albers as Otto Friedrich Dennert
 Hansjörg Felmy as Harry Dennert
 Susanne Cramer as Ursula Brandt
 Ernst Stankovski as Willy Goede
 Werner Peters as Mücke
 Mady Rahl as Toni
 Baerbel Wycisk as Evchen
 Horst Frank as Josef Schmitz
 Agnes Windeck as Mutter Schmitz
 Siegfried Lowitz as Dr. Schreiber
 Fritz Wagner as Emil
 Reinhard Kolldehoff as Willy
 Karl Hellmer as Karl Mertens
 Herbert Hübner as Polizeipräsident
 Lia Eibenschütz as Frau Mertens
 Panos Papadopulos as Heini - der Taschendieb
 Joachim Röcker as Tankwart

References

Bibliography 
 Hake, Sabine. Popular Cinema of the Third Reich. University of Texas Press, 2001.

External links 
 

1958 films
West German films
German crime films
1958 crime films
1950s German-language films
Films directed by Eugen York
Films set in West Germany
Remakes of German films
Police detective films
1950s German films
Films shot at Tempelhof Studios